The sport of football in the country of Zimbabwe is run by the Zimbabwe Football Association. The association administers the national football team, as well as the Premier League. It is the most popular sport in that nation. It was introduced to the country by the British colonialists by the end of the 19th century and quickly took hold.

Early History
From 1890 onwards, white settlers played football in what was then Southern Rhodesia. As in other sports, a strict racial separation prevented Black men and women from participating in the sport. The first club for Black workers, set up to divert black laborers from protests and gambling, was Highlanders F.C., which was founded in Bulawayo in the 1920s. At the time, the white settler clubs, as the Highlanders, where football clubs from and for men. If women's football was organised in some form at the time is unknown.

A men's national team was first formed to play the visiting England Amateur national football team in 1929. In 1946 a men's national team played a first full international against Northern Rhodesia (Zambia). Until 1965, only white men were selected to play for the national team.

Football governance
The Zimbabwe Football Association (ZIFA) is the governing body of football in Zimbabwe. It was formed in 1892 and governs men's football since then and women's football since the mid 1990s.

ZIFA joined FIFA in 1965 and CAF in 1980.

Leagues 
The highest tier in women's football is the Zimbabwe Women's Football Super League, while the highest men's league is called Zimbabwe Premier Soccer League.

Cup system
The Cup of Zimbabwe is the national men's football cup tournament, while the Zimbabwean Independence Trophy, often also called Uhuru Cup, is an additional annual cup event.
There is currently no women's cup tournament in Zimbabwe.

Men's national team

The biggest success of the Zimbabwe national team to date was the participation in the Africa Cup of Nations in Tunisia 2004, Egypt 2006, Gabon 2017, Egypt 2019 and Cameroon 2021. A team of players from the local league furthermore finished fourth at the 2014 African Nations Championship.

Women's national team

The Zimbabwe women's national football team is the only Zimbabwean international team that qualified for a major intercontinental tournament, the 2016 Olympics in Brazil. While losing all three group stage matches against Germany, Canada and Australia, they managed to score a single goal in each match. The national team also finished fourth at the 2000 African Women's Championship in South Africa and qualified for the Women's Africa Cup of Nations in Nigeria 2002, South Africa 2004 and Cameroon 2016. In 2011, the women's national team won the 2011 COSAFA Women's Championship on home soil.

Zimbabwe football clubs

Football Stadiums in Zimbabwe

References